Orconectes inermis, the Northern cave crayfish, is a troglomorphic freshwater crayfish native to Kentucky and Indiana in the United States.  

There are two sub-species described;
Orconectes inermis inermis, known as ghost grayfish
Orconectes inermis testii (Hay, 1891), known as unarmed crayfish
The two sub-species are known to form intergrades in the range where they overlap.

References

Further reading

 

Cambaridae
Cave crayfish
Freshwater crustaceans of North America
Crustaceans described in 1872
Taxa named by Edward Drinker Cope